Święciechów is a village in the administrative district of Gmina Drawno, within Choszczno County, West Pomeranian Voivodeship, in northwest Poland.

A palace, a park and a historic church of Our Lady of Częstochowa are located in the village.

For the history of the region, see History of Pomerania.

References

Villages in Choszczno County